Mohammad Alvi (10 April 1927  29 January 2018; sometimes spelled Mohammed Alvi) was an Indian poet known for writing Urdu gazals, particularly a collection of Urdu gazals titled Chautha Aasmaan (4th sky) which became a subject of dispute between the Muslims scholars when he wrote a couplet titled "send a good prophet". He was later referred to as a "kafir" through a fatwa by the Imam of Jama Masjid in 1994, and he subsequently withdrew the line from his book after he was criticised by the Islamic theology school, Ahmedabad.

The recipient of Sahitya Academy Award in 1992 for Chautha Aasmaan poetry and Ghalib Award by Ghalib Academy, he is believed to have significantly contributed to Urdu literature. His authorship includes eighty-six gazals, sixty-six nazms, some couplets and six books, including Khali Makaan, a poetic book comprising gazals.

Biography 
He was born on 10 Apr 1927 in Ahmedabad, Gujarat. He received his early education in his hometown. Later, he went to Delhi where he completed higher education from Jamia Millia Islamia.

Publications

References

External links 
 Mohammad Alvi at Rekhta

1927 births
2018 deaths
Jamia Millia Islamia alumni
Writers from Ahmedabad
Urdu-language poets from India
Recipients of the Sahitya Akademi Award in Urdu
Recipients of Ghalib Award